Hong Kong competed at the 2013 World Championships in Athletics in Moscow, Russia, from 10–18 August 2013. A team of six athletes was announced to represent the country in the event.

References

Results
(q – qualified, NM – no mark, SB – season best)

Men

Women

External links
IAAF World Championships – Hong Kong

Nations at the 2013 World Championships in Athletics
World Championships in Athletics
Hong Kong at the World Championships in Athletics